Thunbergia grandiflora is an evergreen vine in the family Acanthaceae. It is native to China, India, Nepal, Bangladesh, Indochina and Myanmar and widely naturalised elsewhere. Common names include Bengal clockvine, Bengal trumpet, blue skyflower, blue thunbergia, blue trumpetvine, clockvine, skyflower and skyvine.

Description
Plants may grow to about 20 metres in height and have a long root system with a deep tap root. The stalked, opposite leaves, which have a rough surface, are quite variable in shape. They may be triangular or ovate and the margins may be toothed, lobed or entire. Length is up to 200 mm and width is up to 60 mm, which are typically smaller than the very similar T. laurifolia.

The blue to mauve flowers are about 8 cm across with a 4 cm long tube that is pale yellow inside. These are followed by pods containing seeds that are ejected several metres upon ripening. Plants also reproduce from segments that are washed down watercourses.

Cultivation

The species has become a serious environmental weed in Australia on disturbed land along watercourses and in the wet tropics where it smothers other vegetation. It is commonly seen north of Sydney where it has been cultivated for many years.

References

External links

 Illustration and description in "The Botanical Register: Consisting of Coloured Figures of Exotic Plants Cultivated in British Gardens; with Their History and Mode of Treatment" (1820); plate 495

grandiflora
Flora of China
Flora of the Indian subcontinent
Flora of Indo-China
Lamiales of Asia